Christopher Hart or Harte may refer to:

 Christopher A. Hart, former US National Transportation Safety Board Chairman
 Christopher Hart (actor) (born 1961), Canadian actor
 Christopher Hart (novelist) (born 1965), British novelist
 Christopher R. Hart (born 1972), member of the South Carolina House of Representatives
 Christopher K. Hart, President and Vice Chairman of First California Mortgage
 Christopher Harte (born 1949), Irish cricketer
 Chris Harte, American newspaper publisher
 Chris Hart (Family Affairs), Family Affairs character
 Chris Hart (musician) (born 1984), American-born J-Pop musician
 Chris Hart IV (born 1968), member of the Florida House of Representatives